Brendan E. Hanley  (born ) is a Canadian politician and physician, who was elected to the House of Commons of Canada in the 2021 Canadian federal election. He represents the electoral district of the Yukon as a member of the Liberal Party of Canada. He previously served as the Yukon's chief medical officer of health since 2008. In late-March 2020, he frequently made updates and announcements during the COVID-19 pandemic in Yukon.

Hanley was previously an emergency medicine and family practitioner in the territory, having previously worked in the Northwest Territories and Nunavut. He also has experience with Doctors without Borders, practicing overseas in Africa and Asia. He received his medical degree from the University of Alberta, a diploma in tropical medicine and hygiene from the University of Liverpool, and a Masters in Public Health degree from Johns Hopkins Bloomberg School of Public Health.

He is married to Lise Farynowski and has two children.

Electoral history

References

External links

1950s births
Members of the House of Commons of Canada from Yukon
Living people
Liberal Party of Canada MPs
University of Alberta alumni
Canadian health officials
Médecins Sans Frontières
Politicians from Whitehorse
21st-century Canadian politicians